Zu Jia (祖甲) or Di Jia (帝甲), personal name Zǐ Zǎi (子載), was a Shang dynasty King of China.

Records 
His capital was at Yin (殷).

In the 12th year of his reign, he sent troops to fight Rong people in the west until winter.

In the 13th year of his reign, after being defeated, the West Rong people sent an envoy to Shang. In the same year he ordered the vassal of Fen (邠) to establish an army at Gan (绀).

In the 24th year of his reign, he reproduced the Penalties that were used by Tang of Shang to repress the rebellion.

In the 27th year of his reign, he named his twin sons as prince Zi Xiao (子嚣) and Zi Liang (子良).

Oracle bones from his reign show that he changed tradition. He tried to make government more rational by discontinuing sacrifices to mythical ancestors, mountains and rivers and increasing sacrifices to historical figures like Wu Ding.

References

Shang dynasty kings
12th-century BC Chinese monarchs